Thaba-Kholo is a community council located in the Thaba-Tseka District of Lesotho. Its population in 2006 was 10,241.

Villages
The community of Thaba-Kholo includes the villages of Bothoba-Pelo, Ha Botala, Ha Fisane, Ha Khetsi, Ha Khomari, Ha Kou, Ha Lali, Ha Lepolesa, Ha Lethibella, Ha Mafa, Ha Mafike, Ha Makara, Ha Makhala (Kholokoe), Ha Marontoane, Ha Mateu, Ha Matsosa, Ha Mokebisa, Ha Moketane, Ha Mokhafi, Ha Mokhoro, Ha Mokolana, Ha Mokone, Ha Mokotjo, Ha Molupe, Ha Mosa, Ha Mosiroe, Ha Motsiba, Ha Ngope, Ha Nnamo, Ha Nthoana, Ha Nyolo, Ha Phefo, Ha Poho, Ha Poho (Hleoheng), Ha Rahlabi, Ha Rahlolo, Ha Sehlahla, Ha Sekharume, Ha Thebane, Ha Tjako, Ha Tsiu (Koeneng), Ha Tšoarelo, Khamolane, Khatleng, Khohlong, Khohlong (Hleoheng), Khubetsoana, Khutlang, Letlapeng, Liphakoeng, Litenteng, Macheseng, Makhausing, Makoetjaneng, Manganeng, Mapetleng, Matebeleng, Mpokochela, Ntšilile, Phororong, Rolong, Sefateng, Sehlabeng-sa-hae, Shoella, Taung, Thabaneng and Thoteng.

References

External links
 Google map of community villages

Populated places in Thaba-Tseka District
Thaba-Tseka District